Ivan Tasev Vutov (born 19 March 1944) is a Bulgarian former football manager and former footballer.

As a footballer, he played as a midfielder for various teams in the Bulgarian First Professional Football League. A journeyman manager, he managed various clubs in Bulgaria, Tunisia, Oman, and Burkina Faso. He managed the Burkina Faso national team from 1996 to 1997.

Honours
Coach
Levski Sofia
Bulgarian Cup: 1991–92
Bulgarian League: 1992–93

References

External links

Levski Sofia Profile

Living people
1944 births
People from Mezdra
Bulgarian footballers
Bulgarian football managers
Burkina Faso national football team managers
PFC Minyor Pernik players
PFC Beroe Stara Zagora players
PFC Levski Sofia players
First Professional Football League (Bulgaria) players
PFC Beroe Stara Zagora managers
Olympique Béja managers
PFC Levski Sofia managers
PFC Lokomotiv Plovdiv managers
Bulgarian expatriate sportspeople in Tunisia
Bulgarian expatriates in Burkina Faso
Bulgarian expatriates in Oman
Oman Professional League managers
Association football midfielders